The fourth USS Philadelphia (C-4) (later IX-24) was the sixth protected cruiser of the United States Navy. Although designed by the Navy Department, her hull was similar to the preceding British-designed , but Philadelphia had a uniform main armament of twelve 6-inch guns.

She was laid down 22 March 1888 by William Cramp & Sons, Philadelphia, launched 7 September 1889, sponsored by Miss Minnie Wanamaker, daughter of merchant and philanthropist John Wanamaker; and commissioned 28 July 1890, Capt. Albert S. Barker in command.

Design and construction

Philadelphia was built to Navy Department plans, with twelve 6-inch (152 mm)/30 caliber guns. Two guns each were on the bow and stern, with the remainder in sponsons along the sides. Secondary armament was four 6-pounder guns, four 3-pounder Hotchkiss revolving cannon, two 1-pounder Hotchkiss revolving cannon, and two .45 caliber (11.4 mm) Gatling guns. Some of the weapons listed as Hotchkiss revolving cannon may actually have been rapid-firing guns. Four 14-inch (356 mm) torpedo tubes were included in the design but never mounted.

References vary as to the ship's armor. Philadelphia probably had  gun shields and a  conning tower.

The engineering plant included an unusual mix of boilers: four Scotch return-tube double-ended, one single-ended, and four locomotive boilers. This speed was attained on trials but the trial horsepower was only . As with other contemporary Navy Department designs, sails were fitted but soon removed.

The ship's 6-inch guns were converted to rapid-firing in 1898. All armament was removed when Philadelphia was converted into a receiving ship in 1904.

Service history

Atlantic Squadron, 1890–1893 
While fitting out at the New York Navy Yard, Philadelphia was designated on 18 August as flagship of Rear Admiral Bancroft Gherardi, commanding the North Atlantic Squadron. The squadron departed New York on 19 January 1891 to cruise the West Indies for the protection of American interests until May. It was during this time Fred J. Buenzle had served aboard the Philadelphia, as noted in Bluejacket; An Autobiography, a part of the Classics of Naval Literature series. Then to the northern waters as far as Halifax, Nova Scotia. Early the following year, the flagship called at Montevideo, Uruguay, 6–18 February, after which she resumed cruising in the West Indies.

Philadelphia continued operations with the Atlantic Squadron along the eastern seaboard of the United States and in the West Indies until 1 March 1893. She was then assigned to the Naval Review Fleet as flagship of Rear Admiral Bancroft Gherardi. Charged with conducting the International Rendezvous and Review, with a fleet of twelve American ships, he received the visiting foreign ships as they commenced arrival in Hampton Roads on 8 April. The fleet steamed to New York 24 April, where it joined additional foreign visitors to form a combined fleet of 35 men-of-war. President Grover Cleveland reviewed the Fleet 27 April, after which appropriately festive ceremonies took place, initiating a parade through the streets of New York. The Naval Review Fleet disbanded 31 May and Philadelphia departed New York 30 June 1893, bound for the Pacific Squadron via Rio de Janeiro, Brazil, and Callao, Peru.

Pacific Station, 1893–1902 

Philadelphia arrived San Francisco 22 August 1893. As the flagship of the Commander-in-Chief, Pacific Station, she cruised with the squadron, engaging in drills and maneuvers, and visiting various ports on the west coast of the United States, Mexico, and South America, and in the Hawaiian Islands. She arrived at the Mare Island Navy Yard 14 October 1897 and decommissioned there 18 December.

Philadelphia recommissioned 9 July 1898 and became the flagship of Rear Admiral J. N. Miller, Commander-in-Chief of the Pacific Station. She steamed from San Francisco 2 July to participate in the ceremonies attending the assumption of sovereignty by the United States over the Hawaiian Islands. Flagship Philadelphia arrived Honolulu 3 August, and nine days hence her officers and those of the steam sloop , with a force under arms from the two warships, represented the US Navy at the ceremonies transferring the Hawaiian Islands to the United States.

In March 1899, with Commander-in-Chief Rear Admiral Albert Kautz embarked, Philadelphia steamed to the Samoan Islands for duty in connection with the settlement of civil difficulties by the Samoan Commissioners of the United States, Great Britain, and Germany. A landing party from Philadelphia went ashore in the vicinity of Vailele 1 April to act in concert with a British landing party. The combined force, ambushed by adherents of Chief Mataafa, sustained seven killed and seven wounded, including two American officers, Lieutenant Philip Lansdale and Ensign John R. Monaghan, and two sailors killed, including Seaman Norman Edsall, and five bluejackets wounded. Philadelphia remained in the Samoan Islands until 21 May 1899, when she steamed for the west coast via Honolulu.

The cruiser continued Pacific operations until 1902, conducting training cruises, drills, target practice, and port visits.

Returning from a six-month cruise off the Panamanian coast, Philadelphia arrived San Francisco 17 July 1902. Needing extensive repairs, she was ordered to the Puget Sound Navy Yard for decommissioning. Arriving Bremerton, Washington 23 August, she decommissioned at Puget Sound 22 September 1902.

Receiving ship, 1904–1926 
Philadelphia was housed over and became a receiving ship at Puget Sound Navy Yard 12 May 1904. She continued this service until 4 November 1912, when she became a prison ship. Resuming service as a receiving ship 10 January 1916, she was redesignated with the hull number IX-24 (unclassified miscellaneous) on 17 July 1920. She was struck from the Navy List on 24 November 1926.

Cruiser Philadelphia was sold at public auction at the Puget Sound Navy Yard in 1927 to Louis Rotherberg.

References

Bibliography
 
  
Burr, Lawrence. US Cruisers 1883–1904: The Birth of the Steel Navy. Oxford : Osprey, 2008.  
 
 
The White Squadron. Toledo, Ohio: Woolson Spice Co., 1891. 
United States. Hand Book of the U.S.S. Philadelphia. [Place of publication not identified]: U.S.S. Philadelphia, 1892.

External links 

 
 USS Philadelphia (C-4) photos at Naval History & Heritage Command
 Globalsecurity.org
 Watch-, Quarter-, and Station-Bill of the U.S.S. Philadelphia, 1892-1894, MS 112 held by Special Collections & Archives, Nimitz Library at the United States Naval Academy

Cruisers of the United States Navy
Spanish–American War cruisers of the United States
World War I cruisers of the United States
Protected cruisers of the United States Navy
Ships built by William Cramp & Sons
1889 ships